Burst and Bloom is an EP by American indie rock band Cursive, released in 2001 on Saddle Creek Records. It is the band's first release with cellist Gretta Cohn. Some lyrics in the song "Sink To The Beat" reference the song-writing process and their record label ("This is the latest from Saddle Creek"). This theme would carry over to Cursive's next full length, The Ugly Organ, which again contained songs referencing the song writing process ("Art Is Hard").

The opening to Tracks 2 and 4, "The Great Decay" and "Mothership, Mothership, Do You Read Me?", are prominently featured in Emogame and its sequel.

On April 21, 2012, Burst and Bloom was re-released on limited edition vinyl for Record Store Day

This album is the 35th release of Saddle Creek Records.

Track listing

Personnel
Cursive
Tim Kasher - vocals, guitar
Matt Maginn - bass
Clint Schnase - drums
Ted Stevens - vocals, guitar
Gretta Cohn - cello

Technical personnel
Doug Van Sloun - mastering
Mike Mogis - recording, production

References

External links
Cursive official website
Saddle Creek Records

2001 EPs
Cursive (band) EPs
Saddle Creek Records EPs
Albums produced by Mike Mogis